Imam Tohari (born 26 March 1976) is a retired badminton player from Indonesia who specialized in doubles events. He was the mixed doubles bronze medalists at the 1997 World Cup partnered with Emma Ermawati.

After retired from the international tournament, Tohari started a new career as a coach in Tomioka, Japan in 2002. He managed to bring Kento Momota won the World Junior Championships in 2012. In April 2013, he was recruited PBSI to join the national team as a men's singles assistant coach, and in 2016, he began coaching in Djarum Kudus club.

Achievements

World Cup 
Mixed doubles

IBF World Grand Prix 
The World Badminton Grand Prix sanctioned by International Badminton Federation (IBF) since 1983.

Mixed doubles

 IBF Grand Prix tournament
 IBF Grand Prix Finals tournament

References

External links 
 

1976 births
Living people
Indonesian male badminton players
Badminton coaches